Julie Otsuka (born 15 May 1962) is an American author.

Biography
Otsuka was born in 1962, in Palo Alto, California. Her father worked as an aerospace engineer and her mother worked as a lab technician before she gave birth to Otsuka. Both of her parents were of Japanese descent, with her father being an issei and her mother being a nisei. When she was nine, her family moved to Palos Verdes, California. She has two brothers, one of whom, Michael Otsuka, teaches at the London School of Economics.

After graduating from high school, Otsuka attended Yale University, graduating with a Bachelor of Arts degree in 1984. She later graduated from Columbia University with a Master of Fine Arts in 1999. Her debut novel When the Emperor was Divine dealt with Japanese American internment during World War II. It was published in 2002 by Alfred A. Knopf.  Her second novel, The Buddha in the Attic (2011), is about Japanese picture brides.

Otsuka's historical fiction novels deal with Japanese Americans. Her books call attention to the plight of Japanese Americans during World War II. Although she did not live through the Japanese internment period, her mother, uncle, and two grandparents did, which gives Otsuka a personal perspective on the matter. When the Emperor was Divine was the first novel where she portrays Japanese internment camps. With a background as a painter, Otsuka's attention to detail and descriptions employ vivid imagery of situations. She is a recipient of the Albatros Literaturpreis.

Otsuka lives in New York City.

Awards and honors

In 2004, Otsuka received a Guggenheim Fellowship.

In 2011, her novel The Buddha in the Attic was a New York Times and San Francisco Chronicle bestseller.

In 2022, Publishers Weekly named her novel The Swimmers one of the top ten works of fiction published that year.

Works



 "Diem Perdidi" (2011) is a short story that follows the scattered memories of the protagonist's mother as her mother's dementia progresses.

References

External links

1962 births
Living people
Writers from Palo Alto, California
American writers of Japanese descent
Yale University alumni
Columbia University School of the Arts alumni
21st-century American novelists
21st-century American women writers
Prix Femina Étranger winners
PEN/Faulkner Award for Fiction winners
American women novelists
American novelists of Asian descent
American women writers of Asian descent
People from Palos Verdes, California
American historical novelists